The 2021–22 Tainan TSG GhostHawks season was the franchise's 1st season, its first season in the T1 League, its 1st in Tainan City. The GhostHawks are coached by Wu Chih-Wei in his first year as head coach. On April 1, 2022, the GhostHawks named Wu Chih-Wei as their team director, and Liu Meng-Chu as their interim head coach.

Draft 

 Reference：

On August 23, 2021, the first rounder, Lan Shao-Fu had joined Kaohsiung Steelers of the P. League+. On September 28, 2021, the second rounder, Su Chih-Cheng had joined Taoyuan Pilots of the P. League+.

Standings

Roster 

<noinclude>

Game log

Friendly Match

Hsinchu JKO Lioneers Masters Game

Preseason

Invitational match

Regular season

Regular season note 
 Due to the COVID-19 pandemic preventive measures of Taipei City Government, the T1 League declared that the game on January 22 would postpone to May 7.
 Due to the COVID-19 pandemic in Taiwan, the T1 League declared that the game on February 19 would postpone to March 25.
 Due to the COVID-19 pandemic in Taiwan, the T1 League declared that the games at the University of Taipei Tianmu Campus Gymnasium would play behind closed doors since April 4 to 10.
 Due to the TaiwanBeer HeroBears cannot reach the minimum player number, the T1 League declared that the game on May 7 would postpone to May 18.

Player Statistics 
<noinclude>

Regular season

 Reference：

Transactions 
On October 28, 2021, Hasheem Thabeet signed with the Tainan TSG GhostHawks. On December 24, general manager indicated that Hasheem Thabeet would not join the Tainan TSG GhostHawks.

Trades

Free agents

Additions

Subtractions

Awards

Yearly Awards

References 

2021–22 T1 League season by team
Tainan TSG GhostHawks seasons